The Roman Catholic Diocese of San Ignacio de Velasco is a diocese located in the city of San Ignacio de Velasco in the Ecclesiastical province of Santa Cruz de la Sierra in Bolivia.

History
 January 27, 1930: Established as Apostolic Vicariate of Chiquitos from the Diocese of Santa Cruz de la Sierra
 November 3, 1994: Promoted as Diocese of San Ignacio de Velasco

Bishops

Using reverse chronological order:
 Bishops of San Ignacio de Velasco (Roman rite)
 Bishop Robert Herman Flock (2017.02.02 – present)
 Bishop Carlos Stetter (1995.07.29 – 2016.11.04)
 Bishop Federico Bonifacio Madersbacher Gasteiger, O.F.M. (1994.11.03 – 1995.07.29)
 Vicars Apostolic of Chiquitos (Roman rite)
 Bishop Federico Bonifacio Madersbacher Gasteiger, O.F.M. (1974.08.21 – 1994.11.03)
 Bishop José Calasanz Rosenhammer, O.F.M. (1949.05.12 – 1974.08.21)
 Bishop Juan Tarsicio Senner, O.F.M. (1942.02.25 – 1949)
 Bishop Bertoldo Bühl, O.F.M. (1931.01.08 – 1941)

Coadjutor bishops
Carlos Stetter (1995)
Federico Bonifacio Madersbacher Gasteiger, O.F.M. (1970-1974), as Coadjutor Vicar Apostolic

Auxiliary bishop
Carlos Stetter (1987-1995), appointed Coadjutor here

See also
Roman Catholicism in Bolivia

References

External links
 GCatholic.org

Roman Catholic dioceses in Bolivia
Christian organizations established in 1930
Roman Catholic dioceses and prelatures established in the 20th century
San Ignacio de Velasco, Roman Catholic Diocese of